Eversley Mansfield (4 July 1887 – 18 October 1954) was an English amateur footballer who played in the Scottish League for Queen's Park as an inside right. He was capped by England at amateur level. He was also part of Great Britain's squad for the football tournament at the 1908 Summer Olympics, but he did not play in any matches.

Personal life 
Mansfield attended Rossell Preparatory School, Thornton. During the First World War, he served in the King's Own Royal Lancaster Regiment and was seconded to the Machine Gun Corps. Mansfield reached the rank of captain and served as a temporary major.

Career statistics

References 

English footballers
British Army personnel of World War I
English Football League players
Preston North End F.C. players
1887 births
1954 deaths
Footballers from Barrow-in-Furness
Association football inside forwards
Manchester United F.C. players
Barrow A.F.C. players
Northern Nomads F.C. players
Manchester City F.C. players
Queen's Park F.C. players
Scottish Football League players
Rochdale A.F.C. players
England amateur international footballers
King's Own Royal Regiment officers
Machine Gun Corps officers
Footballers from Cumbria